Selim Bešlagić (born 23 February 1942) is a Bosnian politician who served as the 30th mayor of Tuzla from 1990 to 2001.

He was mayor of Tuzla during the Bosnian War of 1992–95. Bešlagić also served as Governor of Tuzla Canton from 2001 until 2002.

He was a longtime member of the Social Democratic Party, until he left it in 2017 to join Our Party.

References

External links
Selim Bešlagić at parlament.ba

1942 births
Living people
Politicians from Tuzla
Bosniaks of Bosnia and Herzegovina
Bosniak politicians
Social Democratic Party of Bosnia and Herzegovina politicians
Our Party (Bosnia and Herzegovina) politicians
Mayors of Tuzla